Thomas James Alexander Laskey (29 March 1913 – 14 January 1997) was an Australian rules footballer who played with Fitzroy in the Victorian Football League (VFL).

Notes

External links 

1913 births
1997 deaths
Australian rules footballers from Melbourne
Fitzroy Football Club players
Brunswick Football Club players
Camberwell Football Club players
People from Carlton North, Victoria